Tick, Tick... Boom! (styled as tick, tick... BOOM!) is a musical by Jonathan Larson. It tells the story of an aspiring composer named Jon, who lives in New York City in 1990. Jon is worried he has made the wrong career choice to be part of the performing arts. The story is semi-autobiographical, as stated by Larson's father in the liner notes of the cast recording – Larson had been trying to establish himself in theater since the early 1980s.

Larson began to perform the piece as a solo work in 1990.  After his death in 1996, it was revised and revamped by playwright David Auburn as a three-actor piece and was premiered Off-Broadway in 2001. Since then, the show has had an Off West End production, a West End production, an American national tour, two Off-Broadway revivals, in 2014 and 2016, and numerous local and international productions.

A film adaptation, directed by Lin-Manuel Miranda and starring Andrew Garfield in the lead role, was released by Netflix in November 2021. It was generally well received by critics with Garfield receiving an Academy Award nomination for his performance.

History
The show was first performed as a workshop between September 6 and September 9, 1990 by Jonathan Larson at the Off-Broadway playhouse Second Stage Theater under the title Boho Days. Larson revised the developing piece following the Second Stage workshop, changing the title to Tick, Tick... Boom!, and presented with him as performer in November 1991 at the Village Gate (produced by Larson's college friend Victoria Leacock), and then later in 1992 and 1993 in the "O Solo Mio" fests at New York Theatre Workshop. Larson performed the show as a "rock monologue", a new form of theatre for the time.  The performance attracted the attention of a young producer named Jeffrey Seller, who became a fan of Larson's work.  In 1995, he saw the New York Theatre Workshop production of Larson's musical Rent and convinced his fellow producers to bring it to Broadway.

After Larson's death in 1996, Leacock asked David Auburn, author of the Pulitzer Prize-winning play Proof, to reconfigure Tick, Tick... Boom!. He restructured the monologue into a three-actor musical, with one actor playing Jon and the other two actors playing Michael and Susan, as well as all the other roles in the show. Also, the script and score were streamlined and edited. This revised version of the piece premiered Off-Broadway at the Jane Street Theater on May 23, 2001. Auburn received credit as "Script Consultant".

Plot
Jon is an aspiring composer for musical theater, who lives in SoHo, New York.  The year is 1990, and as his 30th birthday approaches Jon is worried about his aging and lack of achievement ("30/90").  Michael, a friend of Jon's since childhood, gave up acting to pursue a more lucrative career in marketing. Susan, Jon's girlfriend, is a dancer who teaches ballet to "wealthy and untalented children". On the roof of his apartment building, Jon reveals that he is nervous about an upcoming workshop of his newest musical, SUPERBIA. When Susan comes to join him, he comments on her dress and how beautiful it makes her look ("Green Green Dress").

The next morning, Susan asks Jon about the possibility of leaving New York.  Jon is torn between following his dream of composing and opting for security and family in a different career ("Johnny Can’t Decide"). His reverie is cut short when he remembers his day job as a waiter in a SoHo diner ("Sunday").

After work, Michael picks Jon up in his brand new BMW to show Jon his new apartment. Michael exults at the thought of a life of luxury ("No More"), and pressures Jon further to consider changing his career path. He agrees to accompany Michael to work the next day and visit a brainstorming session at his firm. Back at home, Jon plans to spend the remainder of the evening composing, but is interrupted by a call from Susan ("Therapy").

At Michael's office, the brainstorming session involves naming a cooking fat substitute through a convoluted process.  Jon sees the futility of the process and his unwillingness to cooperate gets him removed from the meeting. As Jon drives Michael to the airport for a business trip, they argue about the meeting. Michael tells Jon that the life Susan wants doesn't sound bad, and that he wishes his job could give him the chance to settle down ("Real Life").

After dropping Michael off, Jon goes to a rehearsal for SUPERBIA, but not before stopping to get a snack of Twinkies ("Sugar"). At the market, he spies Karessa Johnson, one of his actors for SUPERBIA. She reveals a similar weakness for Twinkies, and this leads to a sudden friendship between the two. After the rehearsal, Susan sees Jon and Karessa walking together and becomes jealous. Jon begs Susan to stay and be with him. Despite this, she leaves for home, and Jon thinks about what may have happened to make her behave this way ("See Her Smile").

The next morning, Jon arrives early at the theater for the workshop of SUPERBIA. Karessa steals the show with her performance of “Come to Your Senses”. Jon gets many congratulations, but no offers to produce the show, and so, in his eyes, the workshop has been a failure. Jon visits Michael and tells him that he is through with music. Michael says that while he enjoys how he makes a lot more money now, he finds the job to be banal and unrewarding. The two argue, and Jon yells at Michael for not understanding fear or insecurity. Michael responds by telling Jon that he is HIV-positive. Shocked, Jon leaves quickly and wanders through Central Park until he finds himself at the closed Delacorte Theater. He finds an old rehearsal piano and begins to play it while collecting his thoughts. Jon ponders on whether the amount of sacrifice required for his career in music is worth it, and whether those telling him to "have it all, play the game" are right ("Why"). Ultimately, he realizes that he will only be happy as a professional composer, no matter what hardships that may bring.

The next morning is Jon's thirtieth birthday party ("30/90 Reprise"). He sees Susan, who is getting ready to leave. She gives him his birthday gift: a thousand sheets of blank manuscript paper. They agree to write to each other, and she leaves. The phone rings, and the caller is Jon's idol, Stephen Sondheim. Sondheim leaves Jon his contact information so they can meet and discuss SUPERBIA. Jon realizes that he is surrounded by friends and that his talents are finally being recognized.

Characters
 Jonathan (also called: Jon, Johnny) Voice Type: Tenor
 Michael (also plays: Jon's Dad, Executive, Temp, Market research guy, Counter guy, Rosa Stevens) Voice Type: Tenor
 Susan (also plays: Rosa Stevens, Jon's Mom, Secretary, Judy Wright, Karessa Johnson) Voice Type: Mezzo-soprano

Musical numbers 
 "30/90" – Jon, Michael, Susan
 "Green Green Dress" – Jon, Susan
 "Johnny Can't Decide" – Jon, Susan, Michael
 "Sunday" – Jon and Diner Patrons
 "No More" – Michael, Jon
 "Therapy" – Jon, Susan
 "Times Square"
 "Real Life" – Michael and Company
 "Sugar" – Jon, Karessa, Counter Guy
 "See Her Smile" – Jon and Company (including a reprise of "Real Life")
 "Superbia Intro"
 "Come to Your Senses" – Karessa
 "Why" – Jon
 "30/90 Reprise" – Jon
 "Louder Than Words" – Company

Notes
"No More" features a sample from Movin' On Up, the theme song of the television series The Jeffersons
"Sunday", Jon's song at the diner, is based on the Act I Finale from the Stephen Sondheim musical Sunday in the Park with George; Larson conceived it as a humorous homage to Sondheim, one of his largest influences.
In "Johnny Can't Decide", all the characters are referring to themselves in third-person, just like George in the song "Lesson #8" from Sunday in the Park with George. In the monologue version of the musical, only Jon did this.
Another reference to Sondheim is present in the song "Why". Not only mentioning West Side Story in the lyrics, the song utilizes the same tritone made famous in the West Side Story song "Maria".
"Why" contains fragments of several other songs: "Yellow Bird", "Let's Go Fly a Kite" from the film Mary Poppins, "Cool" and "Tonight – Quintet" both from West Side Story, and "Come to Your Senses" from Larson's Superbia.
On the cast recording, there is an additional song cut from the final version of the show, "Boho Days".  This track is one of the few recordings of Larson's voice publicly available. It was extracted from a demo tape recorded by Larson during the development of Tick, Tick... Boom!
On the 1989 demo album of Tick, Tick... Boom!, one track is "Why", performed by Larson himself. In this recording, in place of "Come to Your Senses" is a fragment of "LCD Readout", which also comes from Superbia.

 Productions 
2001 Off-Broadway premiere
The revamped musical premiered off-Broadway at the Jane Street Theater on May 23, 2001, and closed on January 6, 2002. Directed by Scott Schwartz, with choreography by Christopher Gattelli, the cast was Raúl Esparza as Jon, Jerry Dixon as Michael, and Amy Spanger as Susan.  Molly Ringwald and Natascia Diaz later replaced Spanger as Susan, and Joey McIntyre replaced Esparza as Jon. The production received seven Drama Desk Award nominations, including Outstanding Musical, and won the Outer Critics Circle Award for Outstanding Off-Broadway Musical; Esparza won an Obie Award for his performance. The original cast recording was released in 2001 by RCA Victor Broadway.

The off-Broadway production was imported to Seoul, South Korea briefly, with McIntyre, Dixon, and Diaz making up the cast.

2003 American national tour
A touring production of the show was directed by Schwartz, with Christian Campbell as Jon, Nikki Snelson as Susan, and Wilson Cruz as Michael.  The tour performed in Dallas, Fort Lauderdale, West Palm Beach, East Lansing, Michigan, Philadelphia, Baltimore, Minneapolis, Hershey, Pennsylvania, Nashville, Washington, D.C., Pittsburgh, Chicago, and Boston.

2005 London premiereTick, Tick... Boom! opened in London at the Menier Chocolate Factory on May 31, 2005, running until August 28, 2005. Again directed by Scott Schwartz, the cast featured Neil Patrick Harris as Jon – later replaced by Christian Campbell – Tee Jaye as Michael, and Cassidy Janson as Susan.

2005–06 California production
A California production ran at the Rubicon Theatre Company in Ventura, California, from November 19, 2005, through December 18, 2005.  Scott Schwartz directed, with a cast including Andrew Samonsky as Jon, Wilson Cruz as Michael, and Natascia Diaz as Susan.  The production moved to the Coronet Theatre, West Hollywood, California, through July 16, 2006, with Tami Tappan Damiano as Susan.

2005 Canadian premiere
A Toronto production was mounted by Acting Up Stage Theatre Company at the Poor Alex Theatre in 2005.  The director was Mario D'Alimonte, and the cast consisted of Dean Armstrong as Jon, Michael Dufays as Michael, and Daphne Moens as Susan.

2009 London West End premiereTick, Tick... Boom! had its West End premiere in a limited engagement at the Duchess Theatre from May 13–17, 2009, forming part of the 2009 Notes from New York season. Directed by Hannah Chissick, the cast comprised Paul Keating as Jon, Julie Atherton as Susan, and Leon Lopez as Michael.

2014 Encores! Off-Center revival
New York City Center's Encores! Off-Center series produced a revival of Tick, Tick... Boom! starring Lin-Manuel Miranda as Jon, Karen Olivo as Susan, and Leslie Odom Jr. as Michael. Performances were June 25 through 28, 2014. Oliver Butler directed.

2016 Off-Broadway revivalTick, Tick... Boom! was revived in October 2016 at the Acorn Theater at Theatre Row, starring Ciara Renée, Nick Blaemire, and George Salazar. Previews began on October 4, the show opened on October 20, and it closed on December 18, 2016.  It was directed by Jonathan Silverstein, the Artistic Director of Keen Company. Lilli Cooper took over the role of Susan on November 22, 2016.

Other productions
2003–2004 European premiere
The Hungarian production opened on July 23, 2003, on the open-air stage of Pécs, Hungary.  It was directed by Tamás Balikó, the director of the National Theatre of Pécs, with musical direction by Zoltán Bókai.  The cast was Attila Németh as Jon, Lilla Polyák as Susan, and István Fillár/Tamás Gregorovics as Michael.

The production moved to the National Theatre of Pécs, where it opened on November 4, 2003, with new cast members: Bernadett Tunyogi as Susan and Attila Csengeri as Jon.  The production closed on February 26, 2004.

2007 Danish premiere
A Danish production played in 2007, starring Mads Æbeløe Nielsen as Jon, Thomas Bay Pedersen as Michael, and Christina Elisabeth Mørkøre as Susan, and directed by Jens Frausing.  A recording of the Danish production was released in 2007.

2008 Mexican premiere
Starring Marco Anthonio as Jon, Natalia Sosa as Susan and Beto Torres as Michael, this production opened at Teatro Rafael Solana on February 20, 2008.

2008 Canadian premiere
Ignition Theatre produced the production in May 2008 at The Matchbox in Red Deer, Alberta, Canada. It starred Joel Crichton as Jon, Wilmari Myburgh as Susan, and Curtis Labelle as Michael. The production ran from May 15 to 24.

2009 Westport production
The production at the Westport Country Playhouse in Westport, Connecticut ran from June 23 through July 18. It was directed by Scott Schwartz, who directed the original off-Broadway production, and starred Colin Hanlon as Jon, Wilson Cruz as Michael, and Pearl Sun as Susan.

2009 Manila premiere
A Philippine production ran for three weeks in August 2009 at the Ateneo de Manila University. It was staged by Blue Repertory, the university's college-level musical theater group, under the direction of Bea Garcia.

2010 San Francisco premiere
Theatre Rhinoceros presented the play at the Eureka Theatre from February 9 through 28, 2010.

2010 German premiere
The German premiere of the musical opened on March 11, 2010, in Kerpen near Cologne. It was directed by Barbara Franck and Marco Maciejewski with musical supervision by Philipp Polzin. Jon was played by Oliver Morschel and Daniel Wichmann, Michael by Sascha Odendall and Joshua Vithayathil, and Susan by Marina Schmitz and Michaela Berg.  The songs were performed in English, with scenes done in German.

2010 London Fringe production
The Union Theatre performed Tick, Tick... Boom! in April 2010, featuring Leanne Jones, Ashley Campbell, and Adam Rhys Davies. It was directed by Damian Sandys.

2011 Spanish premiers
A Spanish production ran at Teatro Lara, Madrid, from July 14 through 22, 2011, under the direction of Pablo Muñoz-Chápuli and starring Jorge Gonzalo as Jon, David Tortosa as Michael, and Laura Castrillón as Susan.

2011 London revivalTick, Tick... Boom! opened in London at the Africa Centre on October 14, 2011, directed by Simon Carnell, the cast featured Samuel Haughton as Jon, David Adams as Michael, and Katrina Boyd as Susan.

2012 Argentinian premiere
The 2012 Argentinian production of Tick, Tick... Boom! ran at the Maipo Kabaret Theatre under the direction of Nicolás Roberto and starred Andrés Espinel as Mike, Natalia Cesari as Susan, and Paul Jeannot as Jon.

2014 Dutch premiere
Tresore Productions performed at various theatres in The Netherlands from March 3 – May 3, 2014, under the direction of Koen van Dijk, starring John Vooijs as Jon, Renée van Wegberg as Susan, and Sander van Voorst tot Voorst as Mike.

2018 Czech premiere
The Czech premiere of the musical was performed at Theatre Na prádle Prague under the direction of Martin Vokoun and starred Peter Pecha as Mike, Lucia Jagerčíková as Susan, and Tomáš Vaněk as Jon.

2018 Hong Kong premiere
A Cantonese production was performed in Ngau Chi Wan Civic Centre Theatre by theatre company Musical Trio in 2018. 

2018-2019 Brazilian premiere
A Portuguese production ran at Teatro FAAP in São Paulo from October 30, 2018, to January 31, 2019. It was directed by Leopoldo Pacheco and Bel Gomes and starred Bruno Narchi as Jon, Thiago Machado as Michael, and Giulia Nadruz as Susan.

2019 Taiwan premiere
A production ran at the New Taipei City Arts Center in October 2019, featuring New York actor Matthew Bauman as Jon, Anthony Neely as Mike, and Ting-Fang Liu as Susan. Produced by the Tainaner Ensemble, the production was directed by New York director Darren Cohen.

2022 Swedish premiere
Produced by Fourth Wall Productions in Malmö and directed by Swedish director Helena Röhr. Jon played by Filip Vikström, Michael played by Erik Espinoza and Susan played by Kim Bergkvist.

2023 Australian premiere
Produced by StoreyBoard Productions and directed by Tyran Parke. Jon played by Hugh Sheridan, Michael played by Finn Alexander and Susan played by Elenoa Rokobaro.

 Casts 

Awards and nominations
2001 Off-Broadway production

Film adaptation

A film adaptation of Tick, Tick... Boom!, directed by Lin-Manuel Miranda, was produced by Ron Howard, Brian Grazer and Julie Oh. The screenplay is written by Steven Levenson. The film was Miranda's feature-length directorial debut. It premiered at AFI Fest on November 10, 2021, followed by a limited theatrical release in the United States on November 12, 2021, before being released by Netflix on November 19, 2021. The film stars Andrew Garfield as Larson.

References

 External links 

 
 Tick, Tick... Boom! at the Music Theatre International website
 Raul Esparza – Downstage Center'' interview at American Theatre Wing.org, April 2005

2001 musicals
Biographical musicals
Monodrama
Musicals inspired by real-life events
Off-Broadway musicals
West End musicals